Fabio Marangon (born 4 January 1962, in Quinto di Treviso) is an Italian former professional footballer who played as a defender. He made 180 appearances in the Italian professional leagues, including 48 in Serie A while playing for Juventus and Verona.

His older brother Luciano Marangon played for the Italy national football team. To distinguish them, Luciano was referred to as Marangon I and Fabio as Marangon II.

Honours
Verona
 Serie A champion: 1984–85.

References

1962 births
Living people
Italian footballers
Serie A players
Serie B players
Juventus F.C. players
A.C. Prato players
L.R. Vicenza players
U.S. Alessandria Calcio 1912 players
Hellas Verona F.C. players
A.S. Sambenedettese players
U.S. Triestina Calcio 1918 players
S.S.D. Sanremese Calcio players
Association football defenders